Kibbe is the surname of:

 Alice L. Kibbe (1881–1969), American botanist and professor of biology
 Matt Kibbe, American political activist
 Roger Kibbe (born 1941), American serial killer known as the "I-5 Strangler"
 William Chauncey Kibbe (1822–1904), California pioneer and third Adjutant General of California

See also
 Kibbee, a list of people with the surname
 Kibbie (disambiguation)